State terrorism refers to acts of terrorism which a state conducts against another state or against its own citizens.

Definition

There is neither an academic nor an international legal consensus regarding the proper definition of the word "terrorism". Some scholars believe the actions of governments can be labelled "terrorism". Using the term 'terrorism' to mean violent action used with the predominant intention of causing terror, Paul James and Jonathan Friedman distinguish between state terrorism against non-combatants and state terrorism against combatants, including 'shock and awe' tactics:

Shock and Awe" as a subcategory of "rapid dominance" is the name given to massive intervention designed to strike terror into the minds of the enemy. It is a form of state-terrorism. The concept was however developed long before the Second Gulf War by Harlan Ullman as chair of a forum of retired military personnel.

However, others, including governments, international organisations, private institutions and scholars, believe the term "terrorism" is applicable only to the actions of violent non-state actors. This approach is termed as an "actor-centric" definition which emphasizes the characteristics of the groups or individuals who use terrorism; whilst act-centric definitions emphasize the unique aspects of terrorism from other acts of violence. Historically, the term terrorism was used to refer to actions taken by governments against their own citizens whereas now it is more often perceived as targeting of non-combatants as part of a strategy directed against governments.

Historian Henry Commager wrote that "Even when definitions of terrorism allow for state terrorism, state actions in this area tend to be seen through the prism of war or national self-defense, not terror." While states may accuse other states of state-sponsored terrorism when they support insurgencies, individuals who accuse their governments of terrorism are seen as radicals, because actions by legitimate governments are not generally seen as illegitimate. Academic writing tends to follow the definitions accepted by states. Most states use the term "terrorism" for non-state actors only.

The Encyclopædia Britannica Online defines terrorism generally as "the systematic use of violence to create a general climate of fear in a population and thereby to bring about a particular political objective", and states that "terrorism is not legally defined in all jurisdictions." The encyclopedia adds that "[e]stablishment terrorism, often called state or state-sponsored terrorism, is employed by governments—or more often by factions within governments—against that government's citizens, against factions within the government, or against foreign governments or groups."

While the most common modern usage of the word terrorism refers to political violence by insurgents or conspirators, several scholars make a broader interpretation of the nature of terrorism that encompasses the concepts of state terrorism and state-sponsored terrorism. Michael Stohl argues, "The use of terror tactics is common in international relations and the state has been and remains a more likely employer of terrorism within the international system than insurgents. Stohl clarifies, however, that "[n]ot all acts of state violence are terrorism. It is important to understand that in terrorism the violence threatened or perpetrated, has purposes broader than simple physical harm to a victim. The audience of the act or threat of violence is more important than the immediate victim."

Scholar Gus Martin describes state terrorism as terrorism "committed by governments and quasi-governmental agencies and personnel against perceived threats", which can be directed against both domestic and foreign targets. Noam Chomsky defines state terrorism as "terrorism practised by states (or governments) and their agents and allies".

Simon Taylor provides a definition of state terrorism as "state agents using threats or acts of violence against civilians, marked by a callous indifference to human life, to instill fear in a community beyond the initial victim for the purpose of preventing a change or challenge to the status quo." These acts of violence can include both the types of state violence that some argue ought to be considered terrorism, such as: genocide, mass murders, ethnic cleansing, disappearances, detention without trial, and torture; and more widely accepted methods of terror including bombings and targeted killings.

Stohl and George A. Lopez have designated three categories of state terrorism, based on the openness/secrecy with which the alleged terrorist acts are performed, and whether states directly perform the acts, support them, or acquiesce in them.

History

Aristotle wrote critically of terror employed by tyrants against their subjects. The earliest use of the word terrorism identified by the Oxford English Dictionary is a 1795 reference to tyrannical state behavior, the "reign of terrorism" in France. In that same year, Edmund Burke decried the "thousands of those hell-hounds called terrorists" who he believed threatened Europe. During the Reign of Terror, the Jacobin government and other factions of the French Revolution used the apparatus of the state to kill and intimidate political opponents, and the Oxford English Dictionary includes as one definition of terrorism "Government by intimidation carried out by the party in power in France between 1789–1794". The original general meaning of terrorism was of terrorism by the state, as reflected in the 1798 supplement of the Dictionnaire of the Académie française, which described terrorism as systeme, regime de la terreur. Myra Williamson wrote:

The meaning of "terrorism" has undergone a transformation. During the Reign of Terror, a regime or system of terrorism was used as an instrument of governance, wielded by a recently established revolutionary state against the enemies of the people. Now the term "terrorism" is commonly used to describe terrorist acts committed by non-state or sub-national entities against a state. (italics in original)

Later examples of state terrorism include the police state measures employed by the Soviet Union beginning in the 1930s, and by Germany's Nazi regime in the 1930s and 1940s. According to Igor Primoratz, "Both [the Nazis and the Soviets] sought to impose total political control on society. Such a radical aim could be pursued only by a similarly radical method: by terrorism directed by an extremely powerful political police at an atomized and defenseless population. Its success was due largely to its arbitrary character—to the unpredictability of its choice of victims. In both countries, the regime first suppressed all opposition; when it no longer had any opposition to speak of, political police took to persecuting 'potential' and 'objective opponents'. In the Soviet Union, it was eventually unleashed on victims chosen at random."

Military actions primarily directed against non-combatant targets have also been referred to as state terrorism. For example, the bombing of Guernica has been called an act of terrorism. Other examples of state terrorism may include the World War II bombings of Pearl Harbor, London, Dresden, Chongqing, and Hiroshima.

An act of sabotage, sometimes regarded as an act of terrorism, was the peacetime sinking of the Rainbow Warrior, a ship owned by Greenpeace, which occurred while in port at Auckland, New Zealand on July 10, 1985. The bomb detonation killed Fernando Pereira, a Dutch photographer. The organisation who committed the attack, the Directorate-General for External Security (DSGE), is a branch of France's intelligence services. The agents responsible pleaded guilty to manslaughter as part of a plea deal and were sentenced to ten years in prison, but were secretly released early to France under an agreement between the two countries' governments.

During the Troubles, an ethno-nationalist conflict in Northern Ireland from the 1960's to the 1990's, the Military Reaction Force (MRF), a counterinsurgency unit of the British Intelligence Corps, was tasked with tracking down members of the Irish Republican Army (IRA). During the period when it was active, the MRF was involved in the killings of Catholic civilians in Northern Ireland.

In November 2013, a BBC Panorama documentary was aired about the MRF. It drew on information from seven former members, as well as a number of other sources. Soldier H said: "We operated initially with them thinking that we were the UVF." Soldier F added: "We wanted to cause confusion." In June 1972, he was succeeded as commander by Captain James 'Hamish' McGregor.

In June 2014, in the wake of the Panorama programme, the Police Service of Northern Ireland (PSNI) opened an investigation into the matter. In an earlier review of the programme, the position of the PSNI was that none of the statements by soldiers in the programme could be taken as an admission of criminality.

By country

Argentina

The Dirty War is the name used for the period of state terrorism in Argentina between 1974 and 1983.

Belarus

Brazil

Chile

Chile during Augusto Pinochet's rule was accused of state terror against political opponents.

China

The Uyghur American Association has claimed that Beijing's military approach to terrorism in Xinjiang is state terrorism. The Chinese state has also been accused of state terrorism in Tibet.

France
The sinking of the Rainbow Warrior took place in Auckland Harbour on July 10, 1985. It was an attack carried out by French DGSE agents Captain Dominique Prieur and Commander Alain Mafart aimed at sinking the flagship craft of the Greenpeace Organisation in order to stop it from interfering in French nuclear testing in the South Pacific. The attack resulted in the death of Greenpeace photographer Fernando Pereira and led to a huge uproar over the first ever attack on New Zealand's sovereignty as a modern nation. France initially denied any involvement in the attack, and it even joined in condemning the attack as a terrorist act. In July 1986, a United Nations-sponsored mediation effort between New Zealand and France resulted in the transfer of the two prisoners to the French Polynesian island of Hao, so they could serve three years there, as well as an apology and an NZ$13 million payment from France to New Zealand.

India

Iran

Israel

Italy

Libya
In the 1980s, Libya under Muammar Gaddafi was accused of state terrorism following attacks abroad such as the Lockerbie bombing. Between 9 July and 15 August 1984 seventeen merchant vessels were damaged in the Gulf of Suez and Bab al-Mandeb straits by underwater explosions. Terrorist group Al Jihad (thought to be a pro-Iranian Shiite group connected to the Palestine Liberation Organisation) issued a claim of responsibility for the mining, but circumstantial evidence indicated that Libya was responsible.

Myanmar

Myanmar has been accused of state terrorism in the internal conflict.

North Korea
North Korea has been accused of state terrorism on several occasions, such as in 1983 in the Rangoon bombing, the Gimpo International Airport bombing, and in 1987 when North Korean agents detonated a bomb on Korean Air Flight 858, killing everybody aboard.

Pakistan

Qatar

Russia

Following the February 2022 Russian invasion of Ukraine and the initial investigations into war crimes committed by Russian soldiers, there were calls for Russia to be designated a terrorist state. On May 10, 2022, Lithuania's parliament designated Russia a terrorist state and its actions in Ukraine a genocide.  The US Senate unanimously passed a resolution to this effect on July 27, 2022, and the US House of Representatives is to consider such legislation. On August 11, Latvia's parliament designated Russia a state sponsor of terrorism. Ukraine's Verkhovna Rada on 20 August 2022 also designated Russia as a terrorist state. On October 17, the European Parliament approved a request to debate and vote on a resolution recognizing Russia as a terrorist state, which it did on November 23.

Saudi Arabia

South Africa

Between 1979 and 1990, the Apartheid government in South Africa operated a branch of the South African Police known as Vlakplaas who routinely used methods of terrorism to support the state in maintaining Apartheid. These methods included the bombing of civilian buildings (COSATU House and Khotso House), and the targeted-killing and assassinations of anti-Apartheid activists. 

In the Truth and Reconciliation Commission hearings, the former Major-General and Commander of Vlakplaas, Sarel “Sakkie” du Plessis Crafford gave the following three reasons for the Apartheid state’s policy of extra-judicial killings:
(1) “It scared off other supporters and potential supporters; it made people reluctant to offer open support; it created distrust and demoralization amongst cadres.
(2) It gave white voters confidence that the security forces were in control and winning the fight against Communism and terrorism.
(3) The information gleaned during the interrogation needed to be protected against disclosure.”

The most notorious of the Vlakplaas operatives were Eugene de Kock and the askari Joe Mamasela, who were linked to several high-profile extra-judicial killings, including that of Griffiths Mxenge. Following South Africa's transition to democracy, de Kock was later tried and convicted on eighty-nine charges and sentenced to 212 years in prison.

Soviet Union

Spain

Sri Lanka

Syria

Turkey

United Kingdom
British Foreign Office documents declassified in 2021 revealed that during the Indonesian mass killings of 1965–66, British propagandists secretly incited anti-communists including army generals to eliminate the PKI, and used black propaganda, due to Indonesian President Sukarno's hostility to the formation of former British colonies into the Malayan federation from 1963. British Prime Minister Harold Wilson's government had instructed propaganda specialists from the Foreign Office to send hundreds of inflammatory pamphlets to leading anti-communists in Indonesia, inciting them to kill the foreign minister, Subandrio, and claiming that ethnic Chinese Indonesians deserved the violence meted out to them.

Britain has been accused of involvement in state terrorism during the Troubles, an ethno-nationalist conflict in Northern Ireland from the 1960s to the 1990s by covertly assisting loyalist paramilitaries.

United States

Ruth J Blakeley, Professor of Politics and International Relations at the University of Sheffield, accuses the United States of sponsoring and deploying state terrorism, which she defines as "the illegal targeting of individuals that the state has a duty to protect in order to instill fear in a target audience beyond the direct victim", on an "enormous scale" during the Cold War. The United States government justified this policy by saying it needed to contain the spread of Communism, but Blakeley says the United States government also used it as a means to buttress and promote the interests of U.S. elites and multinational corporations. The U.S. supported governments who employed death squads throughout Latin America and counterinsurgency training of right-wing military forces included advocating the interrogation and torture of suspected insurgents. J. Patrice McSherry, a professor of political science at Long Island University, says "hundreds of thousands of Latin Americans were tortured, abducted or killed by right-wing military regimes as part of the U.S.-led anti-communist crusade," which included U.S. support for Operation Condor and the Guatemalan military during the Guatemalan Civil War. More people were repressed and killed throughout Latin America in the last three decades of the Cold War than in the Soviet Union and the Eastern Bloc, according to historian John Henry Coatsworth.

Declassified documents from the U.S. Embassy in Jakarta in 2017 confirm that U.S. officials directly facilitated and encouraged the mass murder of hundreds of thousands of suspected Communists in Indonesia during the mid-1960s. Bradley Simpson, Director of the Indonesia/East Timor Documentation Project at the National Security Archive, says "Washington did everything in its power to encourage and facilitate the army-led massacre of alleged PKI members, and U.S. officials worried only that the killing of the party's unarmed supporters might not go far enough, permitting Sukarno to return to power and frustrate the [Johnson] Administration's emerging plans for a post-Sukarno Indonesia." According to Simpson, the terror in Indonesia was an "essential building block of the quasi neo-liberal policies the West would attempt to impose on Indonesia in the years to come". Historian John Roosa, who commented on documents which were released by the U.S. embassy in Jakarta in 2017, said they confirmed that "the U.S. was part and parcel of the operation, strategizing with the Indonesian army and encouraging them to go after the PKI." Geoffrey B. Robinson, a historian at UCLA, argues that without the support of the U.S. and other powerful Western states, the Indonesian Army's program of mass killings would not have happened.

Uzbekistan

Venezuela 
An Organization of American States report on human rights violations in Venezuela stated that colectivos, armed groups that support Nicolás Maduro and the ruling United Socialist Party of Venezuela (PSUV) party, murdered at least 131 individuals between 2014 and 2017 during anti-government protests.

The National Assembly of Venezuela designated the colectivos as terrorist groups due to their "violence, paramilitary actions, intimidation, murders and other crimes," declaring their acts as state-sponsored terrorism.

Criticism of the concept

The chairman of the United Nations Counter-Terrorism Committee has said the twelve previous international conventions on terrorism had never referred to state terrorism, which was not an international legal concept, and when states abuse their powers they should be judged against international conventions which deal with war crimes, international human rights law, and international humanitarian law, rather than international anti-terrorism statutes.  In a similar vein, Kofi Annan, at the time the United Nations Secretary-General, said it is "time to set aside debates on so-called 'state terrorism'. The use of force by states is already regulated under international law". Annan added, "...regardless of the differences between governments on the question of the definition of terrorism, what is clear and what we can all agree on is any deliberate attack on innocent civilians [or non-combatants], regardless of one's cause, is unacceptable and fits into the definition of terrorism."

Dr. Bruce Hoffman has argued that failing to differentiate between state and non-state violence ignores the fact that there is a "fundamental qualitative difference between the two types of violence." Hoffman argues that even in war, there are rules and accepted norms of behaviour that prohibit certain types of weapons and tactics and outlaw attacks on specific categories of targets. For instance, rules which are codified in the Geneva and Hague Conventions on warfare prohibit taking civilians as hostages, outlaw reprisals against either civilians or POWs, recognise neutral territory, etc. Hoffman says "even the most cursory review of terrorist tactics and targets over the past quarter century reveals that terrorists have violated all these rules." Hoffman also says that when states transgress these rules of war "the term "war crime" is used to describe such acts."

Walter Laqueur has said those who argue that state terrorism should be included in studies of terrorism ignore the fact that "The very existence of a state is based on its monopoly of power. If it were different, states would not have the right, nor would they be in a position, to maintain that minimum of order on which all civilized life rests." Calling the concept a "red herring" he stated: "This argument has been used by the terrorists themselves, arguing that there is no difference between their activities and those by governments and states. It has also been employed by some sympathizers, and it rests on the deliberate obfuscation between all kinds of violence..."

See also 

 Asymmetric warfare
 Crimes against humanity
 Domestic terrorism
 Ethnic violence
 History of terrorism
 Left-wing terrorism
 Nationalist terrorism
 Religious terrorism
 Religious violence
 Right-wing terrorism
 Political repression
 Political violence
 Sociology of revolution
 State violence
 State sponsors of terrorism
 State-sponsored terrorism
 War crimes
 State terrorism by country:
 India and state-sponsored terrorism
 Iran and state-sponsored terrorism
 Israel and state-sponsored terrorism
 State terrorism by Kazakhstan
 Soviet Union and state terrorism
 Sri Lanka and state terrorism
 State terrorism by Syria
 United States and state terrorism
 State terrorism by Uzbekistan
 Pakistan and state-sponsored terrorism

References

Bibliography

Further reading

External links

Prevention of terrorism
 The National Memorial Institute for the Prevention of Terrorism
 State Terrorism and Counterterrorism

Political repression
 
Dirty wars